Ursynów is the southernmost district of Warsaw. The district has a population of over 150,000, and is one of the fastest-growing neighbourhoods in Warsaw. Nearly 25% of its inhabitants are below 18 years of age.

The eastern section of Ursynów is heavily built up with blocks of flats, while its western and southern sections are often referred to as Green Ursynów due to its lower population density and broad open spaces and green areas. The neighbourhood is considered the bedroom of Warsaw, and is home to nearly a quarter of the city's post-1989 construction.

Other popular attractions include the Vistula river escarpment, Natolin palace and Służewiec horseracing track (built in 1939), used not only for its original purpose, but for open-air exhibitions, pop concerts, etc.

Ursynów is served by the Ursynów, Stokłosy, Imielin, Natolin and Kabaty stations of the Warsaw Metro. The Kabaty depot is located in the south of the borough.

Neighbourhoods within the district 
 Dąbrówka
 Grabów
 Jeziorki Północne
 Jeziorki Południowe
 Kabaty
 Natolin
 Pyry
 Skarpa Powsińska
 Stary Służew
 Stary Imielin
 Ursynów Centrum
 Ursynów Północny
 Wyczółki

Nature 
There are two nature reserves in the district: Stefan Starzyński Kabacki Forest and Skarpa Ursynowska. At Nowoursynowska Street grows Mieszko I, the oldest oak in the Province.

Mayors 
 Stanisław Faliński 1994–2002
 Tomasz Sieradz 2002–2003
 Andrzej Machowski 2003–2006
 Tomasz Mencina 2006–2009
 Urszula Kierzkowska 2009–2010
 Piotr Guział 2010–2014
 Robert Kempa 2014–

References

External links 

 Ursynów Police Station
 Ursynów Information Website
 Ursynów unofficial website